The 1919 Canton Bulldogs season was their tenth season in the Ohio League, and their last before entering the National Football League in 1920. The team finished 9–0–1.

Schedule 
The table below was compiled using the information from The Pro Football Archives, which uses various contemporary newspapers. For the results column, the winning team's score is posted first followed by the result for the Bulldogs. For the attendance, if a cell is greyed out and has "N/A", then that means there is an unknown figure for that game. The green-colored rows indicates a win.

Game notes

References

Canton Bulldogs seasons
Canton Bulldogs
Canton Bulldogs